The Changhua County Council (CHCC) is the elected county council of Changhua County, Taiwan. The council composes of 54 councilors elected in local elections held every four years.

History
The council was originally established and held its first meeting on 4 February 1951 with 10 constituencies. In 1953, the constituencies was reduced to 9.

Organization
 Speaker
 Secretary-General
 Secretary
 Office Administration
 Office of Council Affairs
 Office of General Affairs
 Office of Accounting
 Office of Legal
 Office of Personnel

Constituencies
 1st constituency: Changhua City, Huatan Township, Fenyuan Township
 2nd constituency: Fuxing Township, Lukang Township, Xiushui Township
 3rd constituency: Hemei Township, Shengang Township, Xianxi Township
 4th constituency: Yuanlin City, Dacun Township, Yongjing Township
 5th constituency: Puxin Township, Puyan Township, Xihu Township
 6th constituency: Ershui Township, Shetou Township, Tianzhong Township
 7th constituency: Beidou Township, Pitou Township, Tianwei Township, Xizhou Township
 8th constituency: Dacheng Township, Erlin Township, Fangyuan Township, Zhutang Township
 9th constituency: First natives dwelling in various cities, towns and villages

Access
The council building is accessible within walking distance East from Changhua Station of Taiwan Railways.

See also
 Changhua County Government

References

External links

 

Changhua County
County councils of Taiwan